The 1963 Prairie View A&M Panthers football team was an American football team that represented Prairie View A&M University in the Southwestern Athletic Conference (SWAC) during the 1963 NCAA College Division football season. In their 15th season under head coach Billy Nicks, the Panthers compiled a 10–1 record (7–0 against SWAC opponents), won the SWAC championship, and outscored opponents by a total of 364 to 144. 

The Panthers were recognized by the Pittsburgh Courier as the 1963 black college football national champion with a rating of 26.00, well ahead of second-place North Carolina College at 23.00 and third-place Morgan State at 21.97. At the end of the season, the team was invited to participate in the small college playoffs sponsored by the National Association of Intercollegiate Athletics (NAIA), marking the first time a black college was invited to participate in the playoffs. Prairie View defeated  in the NAIA semifinal game before losing to  John Gagliardi's  in the NAIA Championship Game at the Camellia Bowl.

Key players for Prairie View included quarterback Jimmy Kearney and halfbacks Otis Taylor and Ezell Seals. Taylor later played 11 seasons for the Kansas City Chiefs.

Schedule

References

Prairie View AandM
Prairie View A&M Panthers football seasons
Black college football national champions
Southwestern Athletic Conference football champion seasons
College football undefeated seasons
Prairie View AandM Football